The 2016–17 Moldovan Women's Cup was the 20th season of the Moldovan annual football tournament. The competition started on 2 November 2016 and concluded with the final at the CPSM Stadium on 8 June 2017. A total of seven teams had their entries to the tournament.

Quarter-finals
Belceanka Bălți received a bye for the quarter-finals.Teams in bold continue to the next round of the competition.

First legs

Second legs

Semi-finals

First legs

Second legs

Final

The final was played on 8 June 2017 at the CPSM Stadium in Vadul lui Vodă.

References

Moldovan Women's Cup seasons
Moldovan Women's Cup 2016-17
Moldova